Meo or MEO may refer to:

 Meo (surname), list of people with the surname
 Marco Enríquez-Ominami (born 1973), Chilean politician
 Medium Earth orbit, region of space around Earth above low Earth orbit
 Meo (ethnic group), Muslim inhabitants of Mewat, a region in North-Western India
 Méo, a town in Ivory Coast
 MEO (telecommunication company), a brand of Portugal Telecom used for services targeting individuals and homes
 Miao people (from transcription), group of peoples living in Southern China and Southeast Asia
 Kedah Malay (ISO 639-3 code), a variety of the Malayan languages

See also
 Meos (disambiguation)